John Winfield Stephenson (born  – May 15, 2015) was an American actor, most active in voice-over roles. He has also been credited as John Stevenson. Stephenson never gave any interviews and was rarely seen in public, although he did make an appearance at BotCon 2001.

Early life
Stephenson was from Kenosha, Wisconsin. After serving in the United States Army Air Forces, as a gunner and radio operator, during World War II, John Stephenson took a course in speech and drama at Northwestern University and graduated with a theater degree before moving to Hollywood.

Death
Stephenson died of Alzheimer's disease, aged 91 on May 15, 2015. He is survived by his wife of 60 years, their two children (a son and a daughter) and a granddaughter.

Filmography
Spartacus – Centurion (uncredited) (1960) 
The Man Called Flintstone – Vet (1966)
Hellfighters – Mr. Chapman (uncredited) (1968)
Charlotte's Web – John Arable (1973)
Herbie Rides Again – Lawyer-Second Team (1974) 
The Last of the Mohicans – TV Movie – Colonel Allen Munro/Delaware Chief (1975)
The Hobbit – TV Movie – Dori/Bard/Great Goblin (1977) 
5 weeks in a balloon – TV movie (1977)
Yogi's First Christmas – TV Movie – Doggie Daddy/Mr. Dingwell (1980)
The Return of the King – TV Movie – Gondorian Guard/Dwimmerlaik – The Witch-King of Angmar (1980)
No Man's Valley – TV Special – Herman/Protester (1981)
Yogi Bear's All Star Comedy Christmas Caper – TV Special – Doggie Daddy/Butler/Announcer (1982)
The Jetsons Meet the Flintstones – TV Movie – Mr. Slate (1987)
Top Cat and the Beverly Hills Cats -TV Movie – Fancy-Fancy/Officer Charlie Dibble/Waiter (1987)
Yogi Bear and the Magical Flight of the Spruce Goose – TV Movie – Doggie Daddy /Pelican (1987)
A Yabba Dabba Doo Celebration: 50 years of Hanna-Barbera – TV Movie documentary – Mr. Slate (1989)
A Flintstone Family Christmas – TV Special – Mr. Slate (1993)
Hollyrock-a-Bye Baby – TV Movie – Mr. Slate (1993)
I Yabba-Dabba Do! – TV Movie – Mr. Slate (1993) 
A Flintstones Christmas Carol – TV Movie – Mr. Slate (1994)
Truman – TV Movie – H.V. Kaltenborn (voice) (uncredited) (1995) 
The Flintstones in Viva Rock Vegas – Showroom Announcer (2000)
The Flintstones: On the Rocks – TV Movie – Mr. Slate/Old Man (2001)
Scooby-Doo! Abracadabra-Doo – Video – The Sheriff (2010)

Television
The Lone Ranger – episode – Dan Reid's Fight for Life – Roy Barnett (1954)
Treasury Men in Action – 5 episodes (1955)
Yancy Derringer – episode – Three Knaves from New Haven – Arthur Travers (1958) 
The Real McCoys – 3 episodes – various (1958–1963)
Bonanza – episode – The Sisters – John Henry (1959) 
Shotgun Slade – episode – The Smell of Money – Charlie Cummings (1960) 
The Flintstones – 73 episodes –  Mr. Slate/Grand Poobah/Joe (1960–1966)
Whispering Smith – episode – The Idol – Eddie Royce (1961) 
Top Cat – episodes – Fancy-Fancy/The Sergeant (1961–1962)
Jonny Quest – 6 episodes – Dr. Benton C. Quest/additional voices (1964–1965)
The Peter Potamus Show (14 episodes of it) & The Magilla Gorilla Show (9 episodes of it) – Segment – Breezly and Sneezly – Colonel Fusby (1964–1965) 
Gomer Pyle, USMC – 2 episodes – They Shall Not Pass & Sue the Pants Off 'Em – Major Stone Mr. Clark (1964–1967)
The Man from U.N.C.L.E. – episode – The Never-Never Affair – Varner (1965) 
The Atom Ant Show –  Segment – Atom Ant – Narrator (uncredited) (1965–1966)
Frankenstein Jr. and The Impossibles – Professor Conroy (1966)
The Secret Squirrel Show – 26 episodes – Segment – Squiddly Diddly/Winsome Witch – Chief Winchley/additional voices (1966-1967)
Abbott & Costello – Additional voices (1967)
Iron Horse – episode – Decision at Sundown – Warden (1967) 
Birdman – Various (1967)
Young Samson & Goliath – Additional voices (1967–1968) 
Dragnet 1967 – Narrator  (uncredited) (1967–1969)
Moby Dick and the Mighty Mightor – Pond/Ork/Tog/additional voices (1967–1969)
Arabian Knights – episode – Fariik/Bakaar  (1968)
The Adventures of Gulliver – Captain Leech (1968)
Wacky Races – 17 episodes –  Luke/Blubber Bear (1968–1969)
The Mod Squad – episode – The Girl in Chair Nine – Professor Aaron Tanner (1969)
Scooby Doo, Where Are You! – Dr. Jekyll/Ghost of Mr. Hyde /Sheriff /additional voices (1969–1970)
Help!... It's the Hair Bear Bunch! – 16 episodes – Eustace P. Peevly/The Zoo Superintendent/Slicks the Fox/Hippy the Hippopotamus/Dr. Kneeknocker/Zeed the Zebra/additional voices (1971) 
The Flintstone Comedy Hour – Noodles (1972) 
Sealab 2020 – Captain Mike Murphy (1972)
A Christmas Story – TV Movie (1972)
The Thanksgiving That Almost Wasn't – TV movie (1972)
Mission: Impossible – episode – Underground – Director (1972)
Yogi's Ark Lark – Benny the Ball/Doggy Daddy /Hardy Har-Har (1972)
Wait Till Your Father Gets Home (1972–1973)
The New Scooby-Doo Movies – Red Baron / Mr. Hyde/additional Voices (1972-1974)
Jeannie – 16 episodes – Hadji (1973)
Super Friends (1973)
Yogi's Gang – Doggie Daddy/Hardy Har Har/Mr. Hothead/additional Voices (1973)
Inch High, Private Eye – 13 episodes – Mr. Finkerton (1973) 
Goober and the Ghost Chasers – Additional voices (1973)
Speed Buggy – Additional Voices (1973)
The Addams Family – Additional Voices (1973)
McMillan & Wife – episode – The Fine Art of Staying Alive – Harry (1973) 
Butch cassidy and the sundance kids – Mr. Socrates (1973)
The Six Million Dollar Man – episode – Nuclear Alert – Two Star General (uncredited) (1974)
Devlin – Additional Voices (1974)
These Are the Days – Additional Voices (1974)
ABC Afterschool Specials – episode – Cyrano – Richelieu (1974)
Partridge Family 2200 A.D. – Reuben Kinkaid (1974–1975)
The Streets of San Francisco – episode – The Programming of Charlie Blake – Leonard Paxton (1975) 
The Mumbly Cartoon Show – Shnooker (1976)
Davy Crockett on the Mississippi – TV Movie – Sloan/Andrew Jackson/Blacksmith (1976)
Clue Club – Sheriff Bagley (1976)
The Scooby-Doo/Dynomutt Hour – Ghost of Juan Carlos/Ghost of Milo Booth/Viking Ghost Leader/Ghost of Major Andre/Rambling Ghost / Demon Leader/Mamba Wamba/additional Voices (1976–1978)
A Flintstone Christmas – TV Special – Mr. Slate (1977)
Laff-A-Lympics – Mildew Wolf / Doggie Daddy / Dread Baron /The Great Fondue/additional voices (1977–1979)
C.B. Bears – additional voices (1977)
Captain Caveman and the Teen Angels – additional voices (1977–1980)
Yogi's Space Race – Captain Snerdley/General Blowhard (1978) 
Galaxy Goof-Ups – Captain Snerdley/General Blowhard (1978)
Dinky Dog – Additional Voices (1978)
The Flintstones: Little Big League – TV Movie – Mr. Slate (1978)
The Fantastic Four – Doctor Doom/Professor Gregson Gilbert/Magneto/additional voices (1978)
Casper's First Christmas – Doggie Daddy/Hairy Scary (1979) 
The Super Globetrotters (1979)
Gulliver's Travels – TV Movie (1979)
Fred and Barney Meet the Thing – Segment – The Thing – Dr. Harkness (1979
Scooby-Doo and Scrappy-Doo – Additional Voices (1979)
The New Fred and Barney Show – Mr. Slate (1979)
The Flintstones Meet Rockula and Frankenstone – TV special – Count Rockula (1979)
The Plastic Man Comedy/Adventure Show – Additional Voices (1979)
The Flintstone Comedy Show – Mr. Slate (1980)
The Flintstones: Fred's Final Fling – TV Special – Frank Frankenstone/Dinosaur/Monkey #1 (1980)
The Flintstones' New Neighbors – TV Special – Frank Frankenstone (1980)
The Kwicky Koala Show – Segment – Kwicky Koala – Wilford Wolf (1981) 
 Daniel Boone – TV Movie (1981)
The Flintstones: Jogging Fever – TV Special – Frank Frankenstone/Mr. Slate (1981)
The Flintstones: Wind-Up Wilma – TV Special – Frank Frankenstone (1981)
Space Stars (1981)
Spider-Man and His Amazing Friends – Colossus /Thunderbird /The Shocker / Uncle Ben Parker/Loki/Mordred/additional voices (1981–1983)
The Incredible Hulk (1982)
Jokebook (1982)
 Laverne & Shirley with Special Guest Star the Fonz – Additional Voices (1982)
Shirt Tales – Additional Voices (1982)
G.I. Joe: A Real American Hero – mini series – Gen. Flagg /Old Man (1983) 
The New Scooby and Scrappy-Doo Show (1983)
The Dukes – additional voices (1983)
Mister T (1983)
The Transformers – Thundercracker/Kup/Huffer/additional voices (1984–1987) 
G.I. Joe – Scientist/General Franks/MacIntosh/Mr. Queeg/additional voices (1985-1986)
Yogi's Treasure Hunt – Doggie Daddy (1985–1988)
The Berenstain Bears Show – Additional Male Voices (1985-1987)
The 13 Ghosts of Scooby-Doo – Boris Kreepoff / Freddie Cadaver (1985)
The Jetsons – Commissioner/DWMR Officer (1985–1987)
G.I. Joe – episode – The Spy Who Rooked Me – General Hawk (1986)
Centurions – 15 episodes (1986)
Galaxy High School – Beef Bonk/Harvey Blastermeier (1986)
The Flintstone Kids – Ditto Master/Mr. Gemstone (1986–1987) 
Bionic Six – Bionic-1/Jack Bennett/Klunk/additional voices (1987)
Fraggle Rock – Doc /Philo/Grunge (1987)
The Video Adventures of Clifford the Big Red Dog – additional voices (1988)
Superman – additional voices (1988)
Pryde of the X-Men – TV Short – Professor Charles Xavier (1989)
TaleSpin (1990)
Wake, Rattle & Roll – Segment – Fender Bender 500 – Doggie Daddy (1990) 
Yo Yogi! – Doggie Daddy/Mr. Myopics (1991)
Darkwing Duck – episode – Heavy Mental – Major Synapse (1991)
Space Cats (1991)
What's New, Scooby-Doo? – episode – The Unnatural – Bob Taylor (2003)
Duck Dodgers – episode – The Green Loontern – Ganthet (2003)
Johnny Bravo – episode – Wilderness Protection Program/A Page Right Out of History – Mr. Slate (2004)
What's New, Scooby-Doo? – episode – Uncle Scooby and Antarctica – Zelig (2004)

Video games/Misc.
The Flintstones: Wacky Inventions – Video short – Mr. Slate (1994)
Wacky Races – Video Game – Luke (2000)
Flintstones Bedrock Bowling – Video Game – Mr. Slate (2000)
Space Age Gadgets – Video Short – Jetsons Season 1 (2004)

References

External links
 
 
 John Stephenson at Voice Chasers

1920s births
2015 deaths
20th-century American male actors
21st-century American male actors
American male radio actors
American male voice actors
American male film actors
American male television actors
Deaths from dementia in California
Deaths from Alzheimer's disease
Male actors from Wisconsin
Military personnel from Wisconsin
United States Army Air Forces soldiers
Actors from Kenosha, Wisconsin
Northwestern University School of Communication alumni
Ripon College (Wisconsin) alumni
University of Wisconsin Law School alumni
Hanna-Barbera people
United States Army Air Forces personnel of World War II
Place of birth missing